Samoyed may refer to:

 A member of the Samoyedic peoples, indigenous peoples of Siberia who speak the Samoyedic languages (such as the Enets, the Nenets, the Nganasans, and the Selkups)
 The Samoyedic languages they speak, which are part of the Uralic family
 Samoyed (dog), a Eurasian dog breed descended from hunting and herding dogs from Siberia

cs:Samojedi